The Olympus C-8080 WZ is a digital camera formerly manufactured by Olympus. It was first announced on the opening day of the 2004 Photo Marketing Association Annual Convention and Trade Show. At the time, the C-8080 was set to be Olympus’ first eight-megapixel digital camera for the high-end consumer market. The MSRP was $1,149 USD.

A key feature, described in the name, is the camera’s optical zoom mechanism. Most compact zoom cameras use the zoom functionality for telephoto work where one details in on a remote subject. This camera allows one to set up the lens to work as a wide-angle lens which comes in handy for group or landscape photography. It has a high resolution lens with 5x zoom (7.1 - 35.6 mm) - equals (28 – 140 mm) in 35 mm film format - and an aperture of 2.4 for wide angle and 3.5 for telephoto. Focus range: normal 0.8 - inf.; macro 20 – 80 cm ; super-macro up to 5 cm.

The metering modes for exposure are: ESP, center-weighted, multi-metering and spot. The metering target mark on the screen can be moved in 13 positions in spot mode. For absolute control a live histogram can be activated and the histogram target mark can be placed in 10.000 different positions. An AEL button can lock the metered exposure.

The camera has two sensors for AF: one is based on contrast detection, the other one on phase-difference detection (P-AF).
The metering settings for the focus are: iESP, spot, full-time AF, P-AF and MF, macro and super-macro. The AF target mark can take 9 positions in spot mode.

Movie clips: 640 x 480 and 320 x 240 both 15 frames per second. Length is only limited by the storage card.

The camera accepts xD-Picture Cards (necessary for panorama shooting), CompactFlash type I and II and IBM microdrives with two slots.
Copying to another slot is possible in the camera.
Data storage is available in TIFF, RAW and JPEG format.
Data transfer connectivity is USB 2.0.

The 8080 has a 4.5 cm tilting sunshine-LCD of 134,000 pixels and the electronic viewfinder has 240,000 pixels.

The C8080WZ was succeeded at least partially by the C7070WZ (2005) this being the continuation of the C5060WZ with much the same specifications of the C8080WZ albeit with a slower lens. The primary difference being the C7070WZ was a slightly smaller size and a lower price than the C8080WZ. In practice both cameras had a very similar specifications and target market.

Accessories 
 Converter lenses: wide angle WCON-08D: (28 mm x 0.8 = 22.4 mm),  tele TCON-14D: (140 mm x 1.4 = 196 mm)
 Remote control RM-1 with more functions than the RM-2(only for shutter release)
 Power grip B-HLD30
 AC-adaptor C-8AC
 LCD monitor cap
 Leather case
 Underwater camera housings PT-023, depth up to 40m

What's in the box 
Olympus C-8080 WZ (magnesium alloy) 8.0 MP
Lens cap
Lens hood
Shoulder strap
Li-Ion batt. BLM-1
Batt. charger BCM-2 (1 hour for full charge)
IR Remote control RM-2
32 MB xD picture card
AV cable
USB cable
CD ROM
User manual

References

External links
Some examples of the Olympus c8080wz possibilities
Digital Camera test site

C-8080
Bridge digital cameras
Cameras introduced in 2004